Mohan Sivanand is an Indian journalist and artist. For a decade, until October 2015, he was Editor-in-Chief of the Indian edition of Reader's Digest, India's largest-selling magazine in English. 

Journalists from Kerala
1951 births
Living people
Indian newspaper editors
People from Alappuzha district
Malayali people
Indian cartoonists
20th-century Indian journalists
Indian male journalists